This is a partial list of artworks produced by Pablo Picasso from 1901 to 1910.

This phase of Picasso's life saw his stylistic development continue through his Blue, Rose and proto-Cubist periods (sometimes referred to as Picasso's African Period).

1901
Pedro Mañach (oil on canvas, 105.5 x 70.2 cm, Chester Dale collection, National Gallery of Art, Washington, DC.)
L'enfant au pigeon (known as Child with a Dove) 
Portrait du Père Manyac
Pierreuse, la main sur l'épaule
Portrait de Jaime Sabartés (Le bock)
Portrait de Mateu Fernández de Soto, Bundesmuseen, Vienna
Les deux saltimbanques (Arlequin et sa compagne)
Arlequin accoudé (oil on canvas, lined and mounted to a sheet of pressed cork, 83.2 x 61.3 cm, Metropolitan Museum of Art)
La diseuse
Portrait de Jaime Sabartés
Picasso avec partenaire
Femme en robe verte assise
Couple de 'Rastaquoueres'''Vendeuse de fleursYo, PicassoFemme dans la rueLe Bassin des TuileriesLa espera (Margot)LongchampNature morte (Le dessert)Sada YaccoLe 'Divan Japonais'Le Roi SoleilLa NanaMère et enfant devant un vase de fleursLe gourmet (oil on canvas, 92.8 x 68.3 cm, Chester Dale collection, National Gallery of Art, Washington, DC.)La chambre bleue (Le tub)Femme sortant du bainJeanne (Nu couché)Femme en bleuFemme au chapeau à plumesCourtisane au collier de gemmesProfil d'une jeune femme (fille avec fleur rouge) (oil on canvas, 52.1 x 33.7 cm, Metropolitan Museum of Art)La Madrilène (Tête de jeune femme)Tête de femmeFemme au bonnetFemme portant une capeFemme à la cigaretteBuveur d'absintheBuveuse d'absintheLa femme au chignonLa jupe rougeLe suicide (Casagemas)La mort de CasagemasLa mort de Casagemas (Casagemas dans son cercueil)Evocation (L'enterrement de Casagemas)Femme aux bras croisésFemme aux bijouxPortrait de Bibi-la-pureéBibi-la-purée assisFemme dans un caféCafé concert de MálagaLes fugitivesFemme en vertFillette au chapeauJardin de Paris (Ink and watercolour on paper, 64.8 x 49.5 cm, Metropolitan Museum of Art)Mère et enfant (oil on canvas, 41 x 32.7 cm, Metropolitan Museum of Art)Femme nue assiseAutoportrait 'Yo' (Étude)Femme souriante au chapeau à plumesFemme aux bas-bleusLes SoupeursFemme avec un chienLis jaunesLola Ruiz PicassoFemme aux bras croisésLe quatorze juilletAu caféArte JovenDeux femmesPortrait de Gustave CoquiotAutoportrait devant Le Moulin RougeAutoportrait avec Jaume Andreu BonsonsLes toits bleusSur le pont supérieurLe divan japonaisFemme de Saint-Lazare par clair de lunePortrait de MinguellBoulevard de ClichyPortrait d'homme (Bibi-la-purée)Buste de femmeLa conversationGustave CoquiotCarmencita et buste de femmeAu champ de coursesHomme et femmeAu Moulin Rouge (La fille du Roi d'Egypte)Mère et enfantPaysan de TolèdeLe poète Alberto LozanoRusiñol et CasasCélestine et un coupleChanteuseDanseuse de cancanCourses de taureauxClown au singeJardin publicBallerinaHarlequin and His Companion (Les deux saltimbanques)Crazy Woman with Cats (oil on canvas, 45.1 x 40.8 cm, Art Institute of Chicago)Fleurs (oil on canvas, 651 x 489 mm, Tate)Peonies (Oil on hardboard mounted on plywood, 57.8 x 39.3 cm, National Gallery of Art, Washington, DC.)Woman Ironing (oil on canvas, 49.5 x 25.7 cm, Metropolitan Museum of Art)
 La Gommeuse1902La buveuse assoupie (The Absinthe drinker)Miséreuse accroupieLa SoupeFemme fatiguée, ivreL'entrevue (Les deux soeurs)Vendeur du gulTête d'une femme morteFemme en bleuFemme avec un châleMère et fils sur le rivageMère et enfant sur le rivageDans un cabaretPortrait de Corina RomeuPortrait de Juli GonzálezLa femme avec la bordureFemme nue aux cheveux longsHomme et femmeBarcelone, paysage d'étéFemme aux bas vertsMère et fille au bord de la merHomme en bleuPierreuses au barHomme et femme avec un chatFemme aux Bras CroisésFemme nue IILes deux sœurs (Étude)L'étreinteProfil de femmeFemme assise au capuchonMère et enfantFemme nue ILe boxeurLa VieCactusWoman with BangsThe Old Guitarist (Oil on panel, 122.9 x 82.6 cm, Art Institute of Chicago)Erotic Scene (known as "La Douleur") (1902 or 1903) (oil on canvas, 174.9 x 99.7 cm, Metropolitan Museum of Art)

1903La vie Femme accroupie, Crouching WomanDes pauvres au bord de la merRiera de Sant Joan à l'aubeLe Palais des Arts à BarceloneLes Toits de BarceloneLes Toits de Barcelone au clair de luneTête de femme (oil on canvas, 40.3 x 35.6 cm, Metropolitan Museum of Art)L'ÉtreinteGroupe de pauvresL'Aveugle et sa familleSebastià Junyer-Vidal comme rhapsodeSebastià Junyer-Vidal en matadorCouple dans un café (croquis)Couple dans un caféSebastià Junyer-Vidal avec une femme à ses côtés La Famille SolerPortrait de madame SolerPortrait du tailleur SolerPortrait bleu de Angel Fernández de Soto (Also known as The Absinthe Drinker) (oil on canvas, 70.3 x 55.3 cm, Private collection)Lady at Eden ConcertHeure du dîner (Évocation de Horta d'Ebre)Vieux guitariste aveugleRepas de l'aveugle (oil on canvas, 95.3 x 94.6 cm, Metropolitan Museum of Art)Masque d'un chanteur aveugleMère et enfant au fichuLe Vieux juif (Le vieillard)Vieille femme se chauffant les mains au feuAccordéoniste et enfantsMateu et Angel Fernández de Soto avec AnitaMère et enfant au bord de la merPaysage catalanJeune fille accoudéeLe Vieux juifÉtude de nu deboutJeune femme au café courtisée par un Pierrot (L'Offrande)Tête de vieil homme barbuMlle Bresina assise dans un fauteuilSpectateurs de corridaFemme à la boucleMaternitéThe Tragedy (Oil on wood, 105.3 x 69 cm, Chester Dale collection, National Gallery of Art, Washington, DC.)

1904Le fou (L'idiot)La repasseuseCélestineLe repas frugalFemme à la corneilleDeux personnagesLa chambre de la repasseuseFemme accoudéeLe fouFemme dormante (Meditation)Nu dormantLes deux amiesLes amantsVierge à la guirlandePortrait de Manolo HuguéPortrait de Sebastià JunyentPortrait de Sebastià Junyer-VidalPortrait de Jaume SabartésFemme au chignonMadeleinePortrait de Suzanne Bloch (oil on canvas, 65 x 54 cm, São Paulo Museum of Art)L'acteur (oil on canvas, 196 x 115 cm, Metropolitan Museum of Art)Acrobate au ballon (Fillette au ballon) (oil on canvas, 197 x 95 cm, Pushkin Museum of Fine Arts, Moscow) Au Lapin Agile (Arlequin tenant un verre) (oil on canvas, 99.1 x 100.3 cm, Metropolitan Museum of Art)Femme au châle rouge (Suzanne Bloch)Le baiserHomme nu assis et femme nue deboutMère et enfantLe saltimbanqueFemme couchéeLa VieLa Chumarabe1905Three Studies of an Acrobat (Ink on paper, 24.1 x 31.4 cm, Metropolitan Museum of Art)Saltimbanque in Profile (Essence on paper board, 79.4 x 59.7 cm, Metropolitan Museum of Art)Garçon à la pipe (oil on canvas, 100 x 81.3 cm, Private collection)Famille de saltimbanques (Les Bateleurs)Famille d'acrobates avec singeAcrobate et jeune arlequin Maternité (Mother and Child)Mallorquine and le TragédieFemme à la chemise (oil on canvas, 727 x 600 mm, Tate)Famille d'arlequinTête de Hurdy-gurdyHurdy-gurdyBouffon et jeune acrobateProfil droit de bouffonFamille de bateleursFamille de saltimbanques (oil on canvas, 212.8 x 229.6 cm, Chester Dale collection, National Gallery of Art, Washington, DC.)Famille de saltimbanques (Étude)Le Singe assisGarçon à la ColleretteGarçon avec chienDeux saltimbanques avec un chienMère et enfant (Baladins)Portrait de Madame Benedetta CanalsDeux coqsAu bord du canalUn bateau sur le canalPaysage hollandais avec moulins à ventProfil de HollandaiseHollandaise au bord du canalLes Trois HollandaisesNus entrelacésGarçon avec un bouquet de fleursFemme à l'éventail (Lady with a Fan) (oil on canvas, 100.3 x 81 cm, National Gallery of Art, Washington, DC.)Jeune fille nue avec panier de fleurs (Fillette nue au panier de fleurs, also Le panier fleuri or Fillette à la corbeille fleurie)Femme nue assiseÉcuyère à chevalArlequin à chevalGros bouffon assisAcrobate et jeune arlequinArlequin (Harlequin's head)La Belle HollandaiseLe RoiMadeleine nueBouffon et jeune acrobateArlequin se grimant devant une femme assiseLa Coiffure (Étude)AsservissementJuggler with Still Life (Gouache on cardboard, 100 x 69.9 cm, National Gallery of Art, Washington, DC.)Artiste de cirque et enfant (Ink and watercolour on paper, 168 x 105 mm, Tate)Cheval avec jeune homme en bleu (1905–06) (Watercolour and gouache on paper, 498 x 321 mm, Tate)Portrait de Gertrude Stein (1905–06) (oil on canvas, 100 x 81.3 cm, Metropolitan Museum of Art)Les deux frères (Gouache on cardboard, 80 x 59 cm, Musée Picasso, Paris)Les deux frères (The two brothers) (oil on canvas, 141.4 x 97.1 cm, Kunstmuseum Basel)Salomé (La danse barbare)Jeune homme et cheval 1905–06, (oil on canvas, 220.6 cm × 131.2 cm, MoMA)

1906Nu aux mains serrées, gouache on canvas, 96.5 x 75.6 cm, Art Gallery of OntarioYoung Woman of Gósol (Conté crayon on paper, 62.2 x 36.2 cm, Metropolitan Museum of Art)The Two Youths (oil on canvas, 151.5 x 93.7 cm, National Gallery of Art, Washington, D.C.)autorretratoLa mort d'Arlequin (Death of Harlequin)Portrait d'Allan SteinJeune espagnolTête de jeune hommeGarçon nuTrois nusLes adolescentsMeneur de cheval nuLes PaysansComposition: Les paysansLa Coiffure (oil on canvas, 174.9 x 99.7 cm, Metropolitan Museum of Art)La toiletteJeune fille à la chèvreFemme nue deboutDeux femmes nuesNu sur fond rougeAutoportrait (oil on canvas mounted on honeycomb panel, 26.7 x 19.7 cm, Metropolitan Museum of Art)Autoportrait à la paletteLit avec moustiquaireNu aux mains jointesPortrait de Fernande Olivier au foulardLa porteuse de painsFemme sur un âneNu couché (Fernande)Fernande à la mantilleEl TinenNature morte aux vasesNu, étude pour le haremLe HaremEtude pour les demoisellesNu assis et nu deboutTête de femmeBuste de femmePaysage de GósolMarins en bordéeGarçon et fillette nusMeneur de cheval nuTaureauPortrait de FernandeTête de Josep Fondevila (oil on canvas, 45.1 x 40.3 cm, Metropolitan Museum of Art)La toiletteFemme nue vue de dos avec enfantSatyre et jeune filleGarçon au caleçonLa toilette (Étude)Chevaux au bain (oil on canvas, 100 x 81.3 cm, Metropolitan Museum of Art)La danse (Etude pour 'Vase bleu')L'abreuvoir (La Suite des Saltimbanques L8)Chevalier, enfant, femme, cruche et mainFemme deboutFemme nue (oil on canvas, 81.8 x 66 cm, Art Institute of Chicago)L'étreinteFemme assisePortrait de femme et deux femmes1907Les Demoiselles d'Avignon (oil on canvas, 243.9 cm × 233.7 cm, MoMA)AutoportraitFleurs sur une tableCruche, bol et citronPortrait de Max JacobFemme deboutFemmes nues de profilHibouxTête d'hommeGrande danseuse d'AvinyóFemme nue (Étude)Demoiselle d'AvinyóBuste de femmeBuste de Demoiselle d'AvinyóFemme nue accroupieTête d'étudiant médicalMarin et étudiantÉtudiant médical et six femmes nuesLes demoiselles d'Avinyó (2)Les demoiselles d'Avinyó (Étude)(1)Les demoiselles d'Avinyó (Étude)(2)Les demoiselles d'Avinyó (Croquis)Nu à la servietteLa danse aux voiles (Nu à la draperie)Trois femmes sous un arbreAmitiéTête d'homme (1)Tête d'homme (2)Homme nu aux mains croiséesBuste de marinTête de femme (Étude pour 'Nu à la draperie')Tronc de femme aux mains jointesFemme assiseBuste de marinLes Demoiselles d'Avinyó (Étude)Nu à la draperie (Étude)Masque nègreNu jauneNu couchéMarin roulant une cigarettePaysageDeux Femmes assisesFemme au corsage jauneNu debout de profilPots et citronNu debout, Trois femmes (Étude)Trois femmes (Étude)Cinq femmesNu aux bras levésNu à la draperie (Étude)Fleurs exotiques (Bouquet dans un vase)Nature morte (Étude)Les citronsTête de personnageFétiche (Trois notes)TotemTêteDanseuseFeuillagePaysageCinq femmes IICinq femmes IIICinq femmes IVPablo Ruiz PicassoCinq femmes VNu à la serviette (Étude)L'amitié (Étude)Femme nue en piedNu à la draperie (Étude)Compotier1908La dríade (Nu dans une forêt)Bols et crucheFermièreMaison dans le jardinPaysageVase de fleurs, verre de vin, et cuillèreComposition avec tête de mortCinq femmes (Baigneuses dans la forêt)Baigneuse nue deboutVerre et fruitsMaisonette dans un jardinTrois femmes (Étude)Trois femmesGroupe qui se lèveNu couchéNu deboutFemme nue debout tournée vers la droiteFemme avec éventail (Après le bal)Tête d'homme (oil on canvas, 62.2 x 43.5 cm, Metropolitan Museum of Art)Tête de femme (Woman's Head)TêteFemme nue au bord de la mer (Baigneuse)Le compotierMain et piedNu aux bras levés de profilNu debout de faceCarnaval au bistrot (Étude)Carafon et trois bolsPoires et pommesCompotier aux poires et pommesCompotier et fruitsFemme nueBaigneuseNu deboutFemme nue deboutBuste de femmeTrois femmes (version rythmée)Trois femmes (Étude)L'Offrande (Étude)L'OffrandeFemme nue couchée et trois personnages (Incomplet)Nature morte au vase et à l'étoffe verteVase et fruit ('Mort aux rat')Deux femmesFemme nue de profilOdalisque (Ingres)Crâne, encrier, marteauCrâne, encrier, hareng ICrâne, encrier, hareng IIFemme assiseFemme nue assiseHomme assisBuste de femmeBuste de femme accoudée ('Femme dormant')Femme nue assisePaysageTêteNu dans la forêtBuste de la fermièreTête de femmePot de fleursLa driade (Étude)Visage-masqueNature morteCompotiers, fruits et verrePoissons et bouteillesHomme nu assis (Seated Male Nude)Nature morte au bouquet de fleursPaysage, coucher de soleilPaysage (Deux arbres)Bol vert et flacon noirPaysage aux deux figures (Landscape with Two Figures)Bols et flacons (Pitcher and Bowls)

1909Pains et compotier aux fruits sur une tableCarnaval au bistrot (Étude)Deux femmes nuesLa reine IsabeauNature morte aux bouteilles de liqueurFemme nue dans un fauteuilFemme assiseFemme avec un livreFemme à l'éventailFemme à la mandoline (Woman with a Mandolin)Femme et un vase de fleursLe bockÉventail, boîte de sel et melonBuste de femme (Fernande)Femme en vert (Buste de femme, Femme assise)Baigneurs qui se sèchentFemme assise dans un fauteuilTête de femmeFamille d'ArlequinFemme nue assise dans un fauteuil (oil on canvas, 81.3 x 65.4 cm, Metropolitan Museum of Art)Homme assis dans un fauteuilBrioche et verreTête de femmeBuste de femme au bouquet (Fernande)Femme aux poires (Fernande)Femme assisePortrait de Manuel PallarésPaysage avec un pontPressoir d'olive à Horta de Sant Joan (L'usine)Brick Factory at Tortosa (Briqueterie à Tortosa, L'Usine, Factory at Horta de Ebro)Maisons sur la colline (Horta de Ebro)Le réservoir (Horta d'Ebre)Femme assisePommeFemme qui coudLe Sacré-CœurBuste de femme (oil on canvas, 727 x 600 mm, Tate)Carafe et chandelierTête d'hommeTête de femme (Fernande Olivier)Tête de femme (Fernande) (Plaster, Unconfirmed size: 405 x 230 x 260 mm, Tate)Carnaval au bistrot (Étude)Baigneurs dans un paysageNature morte à la chocolatièreSaint-Antoine et ArlequinFemme assise (Femme au châle)Le chapeauFemme nue assiseBuste d'ArlequinJeune fille assiseMaisons et palmiers IIPaysage avec palmiers IIPaysage avec palmiers IIIMaisons et palmiers IMaisons et palmiers IIPaysage avec un pontPaysage (La montagne de Santa Barbara)Buste d'homme (L'athlète)MadonneNature morte à la briocheLa dame au chapeau noirTête de femme (Fernande)Nature morte (coffret, compotier, tasse)Coffret, compotier, tasseFemme nue assise (1909–10) (oil on canvas, 921 x 730 mm, Tate)Paysanne assise ('L'Italienne de Derain')PommeAutoportraitVerre, pomme et livresMoulin à Horta d'EbreHomme au chapeau (Portrait de Braque)Maisons sur la collineVerres et fruitsNature morte au cuir à rasoirNature morte aux oignonsCarafon, pot et compotierVase, gourde et fruits sur une tableLes poissonsLe pressoir à huilePortrait de Clovis SagotBaigneuseMan with Arms CrossedThe Oil Mill (Moulin à huile)Still Life, Casket, Cup, Apples and Glass1910Portrait de Daniel-Henry Kahnweiler (oil on canvas, 101.1 x 73.3 cm, Art Institute of Chicago)Jeune fille à la mandoline (Fanny Tellier)Nature morte avec verre et citronFemme à la mandolineVase de fleursLes jumellesLe rameurLe port de CadaquésFemme nueFemme et pot de moutardeFemme à la mandolineLa table de toilettePortrait d'Ambroise VollardPortrait de Wilhelm UhdeFemme nue deboutBarque grecque à CadaquésMademoiselle LéonideFemme nue en piedLe guitaristeNude Woman (oil on canvas, 187.3 x 61 cm, National Gallery of Art, Washington, DC.)Femme nue assiseTête d'hommeMademoiselle Leonie (Étude)Composition cubisteBarque (Etudes)Barque (Etudes) (Nabucodonosor)Mademoiselle Léonie (Étude)Femme nue dans CadaquésL'encrierLe compotierStudentin''

Selected works, 1908–1910

References

1901-1910
Picasso 1901-1910